Maaz Khan (born 15 December 2000) is a Pakistani cricketer. He made his Twenty20 debut for the Lahore Qalandars in the 2018 Abu Dhabi T20 Trophy on 6 October 2018.

He belongs from Bajaur District.

He made his List A debut on 26 March 2022, for Khyber Pakhtunkhwa in the 2021–22 Pakistan Cup.

References

External links
 

Living people
Pakistani cricketers
Lahore Qalandars cricketers
Khyber Pakhtunkhwa cricketers
Place of birth missing (living people)
Year of birth missing (living people)